Lleyton Hewitt was the defending champion and won in the final 4–6, 6–1, 6–4 against Tim Henman. This was the prelude to him winning the Wimbledon title the following fortnight.

Seeds
The top eight seeds received a bye to the second round.

  Lleyton Hewitt (champion)
  Tim Henman (final)
  Thomas Enqvist (second round)
  Max Mirnyi (second round)
  Sjeng Schalken (semifinals)
  Greg Rusedski (second round)
  James Blake (second round)
  Xavier Malisse (third round)
  Todd Martin (quarterfinals)
  Wayne Ferreira (quarterfinals, retired)
  Jarkko Nieminen (first round)
  Jan-Michael Gambill (third round)
  Adrian Voinea (second round)
  Olivier Rochus (third round)
  Paradorn Srichaphan (first round)
  Sargis Sargsian (second round)

Draw

Finals

Top half

Section 1

Section 2

Bottom half

Section 3

Section 4

External links
 2004 Stella Artois Championships draw

2002 Stella Artois Championships